Akbar Sattar oglu Aghayev (1919 – 1944), was a Soviet-Azerbaijani servicemen, lieutenant of the Red Army, and one of the leaders of the anti-fascist resistance in the Buchenwald concentration camp.

Life 
Akbar Sattar oglu Aghayev was born in 1919 in the city of Ordubad, Nakhichevansky Uyezd, Azerbaijan Democratic Republic.
 An Azerbaijani by nationality, he began serving in the Red Army in 1939. In 1941 he became a member of the Communist Party of the Soviet Union. In the same year, he was critically wounded in battles on the Belorussian front and was taken, prisoner. In the summer of 1942, he was sent to the Buchenwald concentration camp for his anti-fascist propaganda among prisoners of war and repeated organized escape attempts.

In the camp, Aghayev was kept under the number 7665 and was known by the nickname, Ivan Sport. In Buchenwald, Aghayev continued his struggle and in a short time became one of the active members and leaders of the underground anti-fascist resistance organization. One of the members of this organization, Y. Nikolashin wrote in his memoirs that Aghayev was "not afraid of death, because the boundless hatred of the Nazis that seethed in him was stronger than fear". G. Boyko, in his book "Memories of the Buchenwald Concentration Camp", wrote that all the most responsible and difficult tasks were entrusted to Aghayev. He was a member of the "Group of Vengeance", which eliminated the Nazi spies and deserters.

Akbar Aghayev, for his active involvement in the Buchenwald Resistance, was executed by a firing squad on August 18, 1944.

Memory 
A street, a high school and a collective farm in Ordubad District were named after Akbar Aghayev.

References

Sources 
 
 

1919 births
People from Ordubad
1944 deaths
Azerbaijani people who died in Buchenwald concentration camp
Soviet military personnel of World War II from Azerbaijan
People executed by Nazi Germany by firing squad
Military personnel who died in Nazi concentration camps
Resistance members killed by Nazi Germany
People executed in Nazi concentration camps
Soviet people executed abroad